FK Ibar is a football club from Rožaje, Montenegro. They currently compete in the Montenegrin Third League. FK Ibar is a part of the Ibar sport society from Rožaje. The club is named after the river Ibar, longest river from Montenegro, which originates in Rožaje. Founded in 1938, FK Ibar is the oldest sports club from Rožaje.

History

FK Ibar was founded in 1938 in Rožaje, Kingdom of Yugoslavia. The biggest successes of the club are known after 1992 when the club played in the Second League of FR Yugoslavia. In the 1999–2000 Second League of FR Yugoslavia, FK Ibar played in the West division, and finished 17th with 29 points out of 34 matches. Two years later, they played again in the Second Division ending last in the South Group. On the all-time table for the Second Division from 1992 to 2002 FK Ibar is positioned 67th with 114 points.
After the independence of Montenegro, the club played constantly in the Second League. In the first season in 2006/07 they played their best season in the history of the club. FK Ibar finished third with 63 points, six points less from the Second Division champion FK Lovćen, and so reaching the play-offs. In the last rounds of the league they lost a home match against FK Lovćen followed by incidents on and off the stadium in Rožaje. They lost their ticket for the First League and were not allowed to play in Rožaje in play-offs against FK Dečić due to the decision of FSCG. In the Montenegrin Cup, the club played the 1/8 of final in 2007/08.

Supporters

Ibar fans are known as Gazije (Arabic: ghāzī or ghazah/gazi, from ghazw, pl. ghazawāt, armed incursion with the intention of conquering - Gazije were the defenders of Islam (Islamic fighters) in the period of the Ottoman Empire). The group's traditional colors are black and white, which are also the colours of FK Ibar where Gazije first started giving their support. After the club failed to reach the First Montenegrin League in 2006, 2007 and 2008, the footballers lost the support of fans since they failed to win the away play-off match against FK Dečić for the First league placement. The basketball club KK Ibar was first time supported by a big group of supporters in the first matches of Erste League in 2012.

Stadium

FK Ibar plays its home matches at the Stadium Bandžovo Brdo, in Rožaje. The stadium has its western and southern stand. The capacity cannot be precisely shown since the stands are without seats. On the most important matches, the number of spectators went to 5,000. The stadium has an olympic track rebuilt in 2004 when Rožaje was the host of Sandžačke Igre(Sandžak Games), nowadays MOSI. In the near future, the stadium will be reconstructed.
The location of the stadium is next to the Sports Center Rožaje addressed on Carine bb.

Players

Current squad

Notable players
For the list of former and current players with Wikipedia article, please see :Category:FK Ibar Rožaje players.

See also
KK Ibar
OK Ibar

References

External links
Profile by Weltfussballarchiv  

Ibar
Sport in Rožaje
Rožaje
Sandžak